Tariq Teddy (12 August 1976 – 19 November 2022) was a Pakistani theatre comedian in Punjab, known for his quick, sharp replies. 

Teddy performed in Punjabi stage dramas and acted in the film Salakhein. He was from Faisalabad. His comedic persona was a fierce rival of the late fellow comedian Mastana, though the two were close friends off the stage. In 2015, his wife Asma filed a case in court leading to his arrest warrants. 

Teddy died in Lahore on 19 November 2022, at the age of 46. According to Teddy's son, his father had respiratory and hepatic issues, had been ill for a while, and had spent his last ten days receiving treatment at PKLI Hospital.

Stage shows
 Chalak Tottay 3
 Chalak Tottay 2
 Chalak Tottay 1
 Mama Pakistani
 Sub Say Bara Ruppiya
 Rabba Ishq Na Howay
 Husn Meri Majboori
 Ji Karda
 Do Rangelay
 Beatho Beatho Liya Dala
 Asli Tay Naqli
 Jhoot Bolda
 Mirch Masala
 Ghoonghat Utha Loon
 Eid Da Chan
 Basti Jat Lai
 Abhi To Main Jawan Hun
 Krazy 4
 Mithiyan Sharartan
 Uff Yeh Biwiyan
 Welcome
 Dosti

Films
 Salakhain (2004)

See also
 Nasir Chinyoti
 Naseem Vicky

References

External links
 comedian tariq teddy passed away
 Complete website of Pakistani stage
 Watch Pakistani Stage Shows

1976 births
2022 deaths
People from Faisalabad
Pakistani male film actors
People from Lahore
Pakistani male television actors
Pakistani male stage actors
Pakistani stand-up comedians
Punjabi people